Littlebourne is a village and civil parish  east of Canterbury in Kent, South East England.

History
The significant Howletts Anglo-Saxon cemetery is in the parish. It is regarded as "Jutish"; finds are in the British Museum and elsewhere, and include two of the very rare quoit brooches.

The manor of Littlebourne belonged to St Augustine's Abbey in Canterbury and the abbot maintained a vineyard there according to Canterbury MP and antiquarian John Twyne in his De Rebus Albionicis.

The viticultural theme is reflected in the parish church's unusual dedication to St Vincent of Saragossa, patron saint of winemakers. The church is in all regards consistent to have been founded by the monks of St Augustine's, which oral history attests, in the 13th century and contains a medieval wall painting depicting Saint Christopher, patron saint of travellers.

References

External links
 Littlebourne Parish Church
 Kent Archaeology history of the manor and church

Villages in Kent
City of Canterbury
Civil parishes in Kent